Mikołaj Radziwiłł,  also known as Mikołaj Radziwiłł The Seventh (1546–1589) was Reichsfürst of the Holy Roman Empire and a Polish–Lithuanian noble (szlachcic), Great Chamberlain of Lithuania in the Grand Duchy of Lithuania and later in Polish–Lithuanian Commonwealth. Voivode of Nowogródek Voivodeship, starost mozyryski and merecki. Member of the Radziwiłł family. He was a Calvinist.

1546 births
1589 deaths
Mikolaj 07 Radziwill
Polish people of the Livonian campaign of Stephen Báthory
Military personnel of the Polish–Lithuanian Commonwealth